Ralph Earl "Rocky" Hager III (born August 29, 1951) is American football coach and former player. Rocky is currently retired from coaching as of the 2021 football season. His final stop on his storied career was an assistant coach at The College of New Jersey (TCNJ).  He served as the head football coach at North Dakota State University from 1987 to 1996 and at Northeastern University from 2004 until 2009, after which the school dropped their football program.  He was also the interim head football coach at TCNJ for the 2016 season.  Hager won two NCAA Division II Football Championships at North Dakota State, in 1988 and 1990.

Hager is a native of Harvey, North Dakota and a 1974 graduate of Minot State College.  Rocky has three children with his wife Peggy: Tiffanee, Rebecca, and Joshua. Josh has also entered the career of football coaching, winning a JUCO National Championship while the Defensive Coordinator of Garden City Community College in 2016. Hager was hired as the tenth Northeastern Huskies football head coach in 2004.

Head coaching record

References

External links
 TCNJ profile

1951 births
Living people
Augustana (South Dakota) Vikings football coaches
Bryant Bulldogs football coaches
Minot State Beavers football players
Morningside Mustangs football coaches
North Dakota State Bison football coaches
Northeastern Huskies football coaches
TCNJ Lions football coaches
Temple Owls football coaches
People from Wells County, North Dakota
Coaches of American football from North Dakota
Players of American football from North Dakota